Elisabeth Falkhaven (born 12 September 1955) is a Swedish politician from the Green Party. She has been a Member of the Riksdag from Halland County since 2018.

On 23 June 2021 she undertook godparenthood for Aliaksandr Kardziukou, witness of the killing of Hienadz Shutau and Belarusian political prisoner.

References

See also 
 List of members of the Riksdag, 2018–2022

Living people
1955 births
People from Halland County
21st-century Swedish politicians
21st-century Swedish women politicians
Members of the Riksdag 2018–2022
Members of the Riksdag from the Green Party
Women members of the Riksdag